Thomas Ruggles Gold (November 4, 1764 – October 24, 1827) was a United States representative from New York.

Biography

Born in Cornwall, Connecticut, he pursued classical studies and was graduated from Yale College in 1786. He studied law, was admitted to the bar and commenced practice in Goshen, Connecticut. He settled in Whitesboro, Oneida County, New York in 1792 and was assistant New York attorney general from 1797 to 1801. He was a member of the New York State Senate from 1796 to 1802 and was an unsuccessful candidate for election in 1804 to the Ninth Congress. He served in the New York State Assembly in 1808 and was elected as a Federalist to the Eleventh and Twelfth Congresses, holding office from March 4, 1809 to March 3, 1813. He was an unsuccessful candidate for reelection in 1812 to the Thirteenth Congress, and was elected to the Fourteenth Congress, holding office from March 4, 1815 to March 3, 1817. He was not a candidate for renomination in 1816 and resumed the practice of law in Whitesboro, where he died in 1827. Interment was in Grand View Cemetery.

References

1764 births
1827 deaths
People from Cornwall, Connecticut
Yale College alumni
People from Whitesboro, New York
New York (state) state senators
Members of the New York State Assembly
Federalist Party members of the United States House of Representatives from New York (state)
Burials in New York (state)
People from Goshen, Connecticut